Aga Syed Mohammad Fazlullah Al-Moosavi Al-Safavi (26 November 1947 – 29 January 2018) was a Kashmiri Shia Scholar and cleric. He was the son of Aga Syed Yusuf Al-Moosavi Al-Safavi, president of Anjuman Sharie Shiyan (B), a member of the World Ahlbayt Assembly and chairman of the  Yusuf Memorial Trust. He was the maternal uncle of senior Hurrayat leader and president of Anjuman-e-Sharie Shiyan (A) Aga Syed Hassan Moosavi Budgami, and the elder brother of the member of the Legislative Council (MLC) and former education minister Aga Syed Mehmood Moosavi.

Education
He got his basic religious education from his father and Babul Elim Budgam. His medium of education was Persian and Arabic. He travelled Iran and Iraq for further studies. He was alma mater of Howza Elmia Najaf and Howza Elmia Qom.

Services
He was a public speaker. His speeches were very attractive. He made Kashmir's largest Imam Bargah at Bemina, Budgam. He wrote many articles in Urdu, Persian and Kashmiri. He served as Judge in the Sharie court at Budgam. He served as religious cleric and spread Islam Naab. He tried to unite the Muslim Ummah in Kashmir and organised many conferences on it.

Death
He died of lung cancer on 29 January 2018 in Budgam. About 80,000 persons attended his funeral procession, and the funeral prayer was led by Aga Syed Mohammad Baqir Al-Moosavi Al-Najfi.  He was buried in Astan Shreef at Budgam. Many political and religious leaders sent condolences on his demise. Raheislam Organisation announced mourning for four days on the demise of Aga Sahib.

References

1947 births
2018 deaths
Indian Shia Muslims
Indian Islamic religious leaders
People from Budgam district